Schreckensteinia erythriella is a moth of the  family Schreckensteiniidae. It is found in north-eastern North America, including and possibly limited to Illinois.

The wingspan is 10–12 mm.

The larvae feed on the flowers or fruits of Rhus species.

External links
microleps.org
Images

Schreckensteinioidea